Patrick Rafter was the defending champion but lost in the first round to Peter Wessels.

Lleyton Hewitt won in the final 6–3, 6–4 against Guillermo Cañas.

Seeds
A champion seed is indicated in bold text while text in italics indicates the round in which that seed was eliminated.

  Lleyton Hewitt (champion)
  Patrick Rafter (first round)
  Arnaud Clément (first round)
  Roger Federer (semifinals)
  Dominik Hrbatý (first round)
  Hicham Arazi (second round)
  Sjeng Schalken (quarterfinals)
  Vladimir Voltchkov (first round)

Draw

External links
 2001 Heineken Trophy Draw

Men's Singles
Singles